Jesper Svensson (born 6 March 1990) is a Swedish footballer.

References

External links 
 

1990 births
Living people
Swedish footballers
Jönköpings Södra IF players
Husqvarna FF players
Allsvenskan players
Superettan players
Ettan Fotboll players
Association football midfielders
Sportspeople from Jönköping